Rock Requiem (subtitled For the Dead in the Southeast Asia War) is an album by Argentine composer, pianist and conductor Lalo Schifrin recorded in 1971 and released on the Verve label.

Track listing
All compositions by Lalo Schifrin
 "The Procession" - 4:18 
 "Introit" - 2:57 
 "Kyrie Eleison" - 4:47 
 "Gradual" - 3:23 
 "Tract" - 2:40 
 "Offertory Verse" - 3:27 
 "Sanctus Benedictus" - 3:40 
 "Agnus Dei" - 4:20 
 "Final Prayer" - 6:00 
Recorded in Hollywood, California on May 17 (tracks 2 & 7), May 18 (tracks 1, 5 & 8) and May 19 (tracks 3, 4, 6 & 9), 1971

Personnel
Lalo Schifrin - arranger, conductor
Bud Brisbois, Buddy Childers, Ray Triscari - trumpet
Milt Bernhart, Lew McCreary, Richard Noel, James Henderson, Ken Shroyer - trombone
David Duke, Bill Hinshaw, George Price, Henry Sigismonti - French horn
Roger Bobo, John Johnson - tuba
Tom Scott - flute, saxophone
John Ellis, William Criss - oboe
Donald Christlieb, Jack Marsh - bassoon
Larry Muhoberac - piano
Larry Knechtel, Mike Melvoin - organ
Dennis Budimer, Howard Roberts, Louis Shelton - guitar
Max Bennett - bass
Ronald Tutt - drums
Larry Bunker - tympani
King Errison - congas
Sandra Crouch - tambourine
Joe Porcaro, Emil Richards - percussion
Benjamin Barrett - orchestra manager
Alexander Saint Charles - voice
The Mike Curb Congregation - chorus

References

1971 albums
Verve Records albums
Lalo Schifrin albums
Albums conducted by Lalo Schifrin
Albums arranged by Lalo Schifrin